Toiana is a genus of moths of the family Yponomeutidae.

Species
Toiana venosella - Walker, 1866 

Yponomeutidae